5 is a live album by Supersilent, released on May 14, 2001 through Rune Grammofon.

Track listing

Personnel 
Supersilent
Arve Henriksen – trumpet, live electronics
Helge Sten – live electronics, production, mixing, recording
Ståle Storløkken – keyboards
Jarle Vespestad – drums

Production and additional personnel
Kim Hiorthøy – cover art
Audun Strype – mastering, recording

References

External links 
 

2001 live albums
Supersilent albums